Arthur Rudolf Hantzsch (7 March 1857 – 14 March 1935) was a German chemist.

Life and work
Hantzsch studied chemistry in Dresden and graduated at the University of Würzburg under Johannes Wislicenus. As a professor, he taught at the Universities of Zürich, Würzburg und Leipzig.

The Hantzsch pyridine synthesis, a multi-component organic reaction, is named after him, as is the Hantzsch pyrrole synthesis.

His surname is correctly pronounced /Haːntʃ/ (rhymes with cattle ranch).

References

1857 births
1935 deaths
20th-century German chemists
Scientists from Dresden
Academic staff of ETH Zurich
19th-century German chemists